The Kazakhstan Cycling Federation (Qazaqstan velosport federatsııasy) or KCF, is the national governing body of cycle racing in Kazakhstan. The KCF is steadfast in its support of the Astana Pro Team as a part of its global strategy to promote cycling in Kazakhstan.

It is a member of the UCI and the Asian Cycling Confederation.

References

External links

Organizations based in Astana
Kazakhstan
Cycle racing in Kazakhstan
Cycling
Kazakhstan
Sports organizations established in 1992